The  is a prize awarded by the Japan Academy in recognition of academic theses, books, and achievements.

Overviews 
An award ceremony has been held every year since 1911. Up to nine of these Prizes are awarded every year. There have been 676 winners and 592 winning works as of 2005. They comprise a certificate, medal, and prize money of one million yen.

Ceremony 
The ceremony is held on the premises of the Japan Academy in Ueno park. The Emperor has been visiting it since 1949. The three prizes awarded during the ceremony are:
 The Imperial Prize
 Japan Academy Prize
 Duke of Edinburgh Prize

After the ceremony some laureates give lectures on the topics of their research.

Recipients (of Japan Academy Prize) 

 2020 
 Minoru Ozima
2016 (106th)
 Kazutoshi Mori
 Yoshihiro Kawaoka
2015 (105th)
 Hideo Hosono
 Hiroaki Mitsuya
2014 (104th)
 Isamu Akasaki
 Takao Kondo
 Hiraku Nakajima
 2013 (103rd)
Yoshinori Tokura
 2012 (102nd)
Takaaki Kajita
Shimon Sakaguchi
2011 (101st)
 Takurō Mochizuki - "Study of pure twister D-modules"
2010 (100th)
 Shinya Yamanaka
2008 (98th)
 Keiji Morokuma - "Theoretical Studies of Design of Structure, Function and Reactivity of Molecules"
 Takaya Hosoka - "The Persecution of Jews and Christians in the Early Roman Principate"
 Fumio Ohtake - "Inequality in Japan"
 Yoshinori Fujiyoshi - "Structure Determination of Membrane Proteins based on the Development of an Innovative Cryo-Electron Microscope"
 Naomasa Nakai - Study of Active Galactic Nuclei and Super-Massive Black Holes based on VLBI Observations of Water-Vapor Maser Emission
Akira Hasegawa - "Discovery of Optical Soliton Properties in Fibers and of Self-organization of Plasma Turbulence"
Kanji Ohyama - 	"Gene Content, Organization and Molecular Evolution of Plant Organellar Genomes and Sex Chromosomes —Insights from the Case of the Liverwort Marchantia polymorpha—"
Kenji Kangawa - "Discovery of Novel Bioactive Peptides with Special Reference to Ghrelin"
Yoshiyuki Nagai - "Elucidation of the Molecular Basis of Paramyxovirus Pathogenicity and Generation of a Novel Class of Expression Vector"
2007 (97th)
Senzô Hidemura - Agriculture and Society at the Last Stage of Satsuma Feudal Fief —A Study of Moriya Family, a Rural Warrior in Kōyama-Gō—
Shizuo Akira -Pathogen Recognition by Innate Immunity and its Signaling
Masaaki Sugiyama - The Mongol Empire and Dai-ön Ulus
Asahiko Taira - Accretion Tectonics and Evolution of the Japan Islands
Shinji Kawaji - Experimental Studies of Two-Dimensional Electron Systems"
Hisashi Yamamoto and Kohei Tamao - Exploitation of Chemical and Physical Properties of Main-group Element Compounds based on Flexibility for High Coordination (Joint Research)
Yukio Hori and Koji Kato - Studies on Tribology (Joint Research)
Toshisuke Maruyama - Water Demand-Supply Analysis in Large Spatial Areas Based on Evapotranspiration and Runoff
Yasushi Miyashita - The Discovery of Associative Memory Neurons in the Cerebral Cortex and Studies of the Cognitive Memory System
 2006 (96th)
Shuh Narumiya - Studies on the Prostaglandin Receptors
Shinsaku Iwahara -Electronic Payment and Law
Kotaro Suzumura -Welfare Economics beyond Welfarist-consequentialism
Noboru Mataga -	Studies on Molecular Interactions and Chemical Reaction Dynamics of Photo-excited Molecules
Yoshinori Ohsumi -Molecular Mechanism and Physiological Function of Autophagy
Atsuto Suzuki -Studies of Antineutrino Science
Ken Sakamura -Research on the Computer Architecture with High Real-time Performance
Koki Horikoshi -Studies of Alkaliphilic Microorganisms: Their Diversity, Physiology, and Applications
Toshio Wagai -Studies on the Foundation and Development of Diagnostic Ultrasound
 2005 (95th)
 Kazuya Kato
 Tetsuya Shiokawa for "Recherches sur Pascal" ("Research on Arithmetic Geometry")
 Shuichiro Kimura for "A History of the German Idea of Welfare State"
 Yukihiko Kiyokawa for "Formation of Modern Industrial Labor Force in Asia — Economic Development, Culture and Job Consciousness"
 Takashi Nakamura for "Theoretical Investigation of the Formation of Black Holes and the Emission of Gravitational Waves" 
 Hiroyuki Sakaki and Hideo Ohno for "Studies on Quantum Control of Electrons by Semiconductor Nanostructures and Ferromagnetism" 
 Hiroshi Kida for "Studies on Control of Influenza — Mechanism of Emergence of Pandemic Influenza Virus Strains in Poultry, Domestic Animals and Humans, and Molecular Basis of the Neutralization of Viral Infectivity with Antibodies" 
 Yukihiko Kitamura for "Development and Malignant Transformation of Mast Cells and Interstitial Cells of Cajal through KIT Receptors" 
 Masakatsu Shibasaki for "Studies on the Development of Asymmetric Catalysts and its Application to Medicinal Chemistry"
 2004 (94th)
 Takafusa Nakamura
 Hiroo Kanamori
 Akira Suzuki
 Akira Fujishima
 2003 (93rd)
Mitsuhiro Yanagida - Regulation of Cell Cycle and Chromosome Segregation
Noboru Karashima - History and Society in South India: The Cholas to Vijayanagar
Mari Nomura - The Jews in Vienna
Kenji Fukaya - Research in Differential Geometry
Koichi Itoh, Hiizu Iwamura and Minoru Kinoshita - Study of Molecular Magnet (Joint Research)
Yasutoshi Senoo - Researches on Fluid Dynamics of Centrifugal Turbomachines
Yoshimi Okada - Molecular Biology of Plant Virus RNA Genomes and its Application to Agriculture
Hiroshi Okamoto - Studies on Experimental Diabetes and Its Prevention
Makoto Endo - Studies on the Mechanisms of Mobilization of Calcium Ion in Muscle Cells
 2002 (92nd)
Sumio Iijima
Akiho Miyashiro
 2001 (91st)
Fumio Hayashi
Makoto Asashima
 2000 (90th)
 Shigekazu Nagata
 Morikazu Toda
 Tadatsugu Taniguchi
 1999 (89th)
 Yoshito Kishi
 Nobutaka Hirokawa
 1998 (88th)
 Toshio Yanagida
 Yasutaka Ihara
 1997 (87th)
 Shigetada Nakanishi
 Norio Kaifu
 1996 (86th)
 Tasuku Honjo
 Shinzo Watanabe
 Masatoshi Takeichi
 1995 (85th)
 Ryōji Noyori
 Shun'ichi Amari
 1994 (84th)
 Makoto Kumada
 1993 (83rd)
Issei Tanaka - "A Study of the Ritual Theatres in China"
Yasuo Tanaka - "The Relativistic Properties of Celestial X-ray Sources"
Takashi Negishi - "History of Economic Theory"
Akito Arima - "Theoretical Studies on Dynamical Models and Electromagnetic Interactions of Atomic Nuclei"
Michio Jimbo - "Studies on Solvable Lattice Models and Quantum Groups"
Takanori Okoshi - "Research on Coherent Optical Fiber Communications"
Toshiro Kinoshita - "Genetical Studies on the Interaction between Cytoplasmic and Nuclear Genomes, and the Application of These Studies to Actual Crop Breeding"
Hajime Yamamoto - "Use of Lasers for Caries Prevention and Other Applications in Dentistry"
Keiya Tada and Goro Kikuchi - "Studies on Hyperglycinemia (Joint Research)"
 1992 (82nd)
Tadamitsu Kishimoto
Kenichi Honda
 1991 (81st)
Akira Tonomura
Tomisaku Kawasaki
 1990 (80th)
Koji Nakanishi
Masahiko Aoki
Shigeru Iitaka, Shigefumi Mori, Yujiro Kawamata
Satoshi Ōmura
 1989 (79th)
Sengaku Mayeda
Masatoshi Koshiba
 1988 (78th)
Masaki Kashiwara
 1986 (76th)
Masao Ito
Masayoshi Nagata
Hitoshi Nozaki
Yasutomi Nishizuka
 1985 (75th)
Toshihide Maskawa, Makoto Kobayashi
Tomoko Ohta
Yoshiaki Arata
Shosaku Numa
 1984 (74th)
Zuiho Yamaguchi
 1982 (72nd)
Shizuo Kakutani
 1979 (69th)
Hiroshi Inose
 1978 (68th)
Kiyosi Itô
 1977 (67th)
Yoshimasa Hirata
Syun-Ichi Akasofu
 1976 (66th)
Takashi Sugimura
Mikio Sato
Tamio Yamakawa
 1974 (64th)
Kimishige Ishizaka
Michio Suzuki
Jun-ichi Nishizawa
 1973 (63rd)
Jun Kondo
Sasagu Arai
 1972 (62nd)
Setsuro Ebashi
 1971 (61st)
Chushiro Hayashi
 1970 (60th)
Susumu Nakanishi
Chushiro Hayashi
Heisuke Hironaka
 1968 (58th)
Motoo Kimura
 1967 (57th)
Osamu Hayaishi
 1965 (55th)
Hiroshi Tamiya
Leo Esaki
 1964 (54th)
Kazuhiko Nishijima
 1962 (52nd)
Kenkichi Iwasawa
Kenichi Fukui
Hamao Umezawa
 1961 (51st)
Shigeo Kishibe
 1959 (49th)
Tatsuo Nishida
 1958 (48th)
Motoo Kimura
 1957 (47th)
Kanda Nobuo
Kunihiko Kodaira
 1956 (46th)
Takahiko Yamanouchi
 1954 (44th)
Tadashi Nakayama
Hisashi Kuno
 1953 (43rd)
Guan Jing
 1952 (42nd)
Hideyo Arisaka
 1951 (41st)
Kiyoshi Oka
Takeshi Nagata
 1950 (40th)
Yūkichi Takeda
Kinichiro Sakaguchi
 1949 (39th)
Kenjiro Shoda
 1948 (38th)
Issac Koga
Masao Kotani
 1945 (35th)
Kinpei Matsuoka
 1941 (31st)
Seiichi Iwao
Shinobu Ishihara
Ukichiro Nakaya
 1940 (30th)
Mokichi Saitō
 1937 (27th)
Ryōzō Kanehira
 1932 (22nd)
Motonori Matuyama
Shintaro Uda
Seishi Kikuchi
 1931 (21st)
Hakaru Masumoto
 1930 (20th)
Okuro Oikawa
 1929 (19th)
Hisao Tanabe
Kenzo Futaki
 1928 (18th)
Yuzuru Hiraga
 1927 (17th)
Takenoshin Nakai
Keizo Dohi
 1926 (16th)

 1925 (15th)

 1924 (14th)

Umetaro Suzuki

 1923 (13th)
No award
 1922 (12th)

 1921 (11th)

 1920 (10th)

Sakuhei Fujiwhara
Bunzō Hayata
 1919 (9th)

Katsusaburō Yamagiwa

Tokiji Ishikawa
 1918 (8th)
Fujiro Katsurada

 1917 (7th)

 1916 (6th)

Tsunetaro Kujirai

Masajiro Kitamura
Kotaro Honda
 1915 (5th)

Kametaro Toyama
 1914 (4th)

Shirota Kusakabe
 1913 (3rd)

 1912 (2nd)
Jōkichi Takamine

Notes

External links
 The Japan Academy 

Student awards
Japan Academy
Japanese science and technology awards